Politics Live is a BBC News political programme which launched on 3 September 2018. It is presented by Jo Coburn and features at least four guests debating the political stories of the day, as well as reports and other content. It is broadcast on BBC Two weekdays at 12:15 (11:15 on Wednesdays), with the Fridays being used for highlights from proceedings from the UK Parliament,  the Scottish Parliament, the Senedd and the Northern Ireland Assembly.

The series replaced Daily Politics which ran in the same time-slot until July 2018. In the announcement, the BBC stated that the new series "will offer viewers a fast-moving, conversational show, featuring a blend of political interviews, discussion and video content designed to be shared digitally, ensuring Politics Live connects with the lives of people around the country." An extended programme of 105 minutes is broadcast on Wednesdays, to include live coverage of Prime Minister's Questions which is simulcasted on BBC News.

The programme is not broadcast at weekends or when Parliament is in recess, or for other occasions such as a Queen's Speech.

Background 
The BBC's long-running lunchtime political programme Daily Politics ended in 2018 after 15 years on the air. Politics Live was first announced on 12 July 2018 in a statement from the BBC's press office.

Format
Politics Live was a Monday to Friday show that aired at 12:15pm to 1:00pm except Wednesday when it was aired from 11:15am to 1:00pm because of Prime Minister's Questions. On occasions programmes were shown earlier or later to accommodate party speeches and budget speeches, on some occasions BBC News will simulcast Politics Live for special programming, such as party conferences and budgets with the Politics Live crew.

In March 2020, Politics Live broadcasts was suspended by the BBC, owing to the COVID-19 pandemic. Although PMQ's restarted, Politics Live did not as Coburn anchored PMQ's for BBC Newsroom Live directly from the Commons lobby in Westminster for BBC News which was on air during the pandemic. Politics Live did not resume until May 2020 on Wednesdays only with Coburn hosting with guests at home or in the studio two meters away from each other because of UK lockdown rules. After the summer recess, the BBC changes their programming plan by scaling down Politics Live to 4 days a week (Monday to Thursday with the same times as before), with a review programme, Politics UK airing in the timeslot on Fridays.

Special broadcasts 
Monday 14 January 2019 — A special programme ahead of a vote on Theresa May’s Brexit deal.
Tuesday 15 January 2019 — A special programme during and after a vote on Theresa May’s Brexit deal.
Wednesday 16 and Thursday 17 January 2019 – A special programme after a vote of no confidence in Theresa May's government.
Friday 24 May 2019 – A special programme after Theresa May's resignation statement in Downing Street.
Monday 22 July 2019 – A special programme concerning the Liberal Democrat hustings.
Wednesday 3 March 2021 – A special 3 hours 45 minute special covering the 2021 budget by Chancellor Rishi Sunak.
Friday 23 September 2022 – A special programme after covering the September 2022 mini-budget by Chancellor Kwasi Kwarteng.

Journalists 

 Jonathan Blake, Political Correspondent
 Adam Fleming, Chief Political Correspondent
 Chris Mason, Political Editor (appears on Wednesdays for PMQs)
 Vicki Young, Deputy Political Editor

Previous journalists 
 John Pienaar, Deputy Political Editor
 Laura Kuenssberg, Political Editor

See also

This Week

References

External links

2018 British television series debuts
2010s British political television series
2020s British political television series
BBC television news shows
British political television series
English-language television shows